Vim means enthusiasm and vigor. It may also refer to:
 Vim (cleaning product)
 Vim Comedy Company, a movie studio
 Vim Records
 Vimentin, a protein
 "Vim", a song by Machine Head on the album Through the Ashes of Empires
 Vim (text editor)

VIM may refer to:
 Vickers VIM, an aircraft
 International vocabulary of metrology (VIM)
 Vendor Independent Messaging, an e-mail API
 Voyager Interstellar Mission, a space mission 
 VIM Airlines
 the ventral intermediate nucleus (VIM), a precise area of the isothalamus, one of the brain's movement centers
 a Verona integron-encoded metallo-β-lactamase (a type of Beta-lactamase enzyme)
 VIM-1, a single board computer
 Virtualized Infrastructure Manager, a component of NFV-MANO network